The ATP Masters Series are part of the elite tour for professional men's tennis organized by the Association of Tennis Professionals called the ATP Tour.

Tournaments 

Note: Although the Monte Carlo Masters is billed as taking place in Monte Carlo, it is actually held in Roquebrune-Cap-Martin, a commune of France adjacent to Monaco.

Results

Schedule

Tournament details

Indian Wells

Singles

Doubles

Miami

Singles

Doubles

Monte Carlo

Singles

Doubles

Rome

Singles

Doubles

Hamburg

Singles

Doubles

Toronto

Singles

Doubles

Cincinnati

Singles

Doubles

Madrid

Singles

Doubles

Paris

Singles

Doubles

See also 
 ATP Tour Masters 1000
 2008 ATP Tour
 2008 WTA Tier I Series
 2008 WTA Tour

References

External links 
 Association of Tennis Professionals (ATP) official website

ATP Tour Masters 1000